Chlorine-37, is one of the stable isotopes of chlorine, the other being chlorine-35. Its nucleus contains 17 protons and 20 neutrons for a total of 37 nucleons.

Remarkably, solar neutrinos were discovered by an experiment using a radiochemical method based on chlorine-37 transmutation.

Neutrino detection

One of the historically important radiochemical methods of solar neutrino detection is based on inverse electron capture triggered by the absorption of an electron neutrino. Chlorine-37 transmutes into argon-37 via the reaction
 +  →  + .

Argon-37 then de-excites itself via electron capture (half-life = 35 d) into chlorine-37 via the reaction
 +   →  + .

These last reactions involve Auger electrons of specific energies. The detection of these electrons confirms that a neutrino event took place. Detection methods involve several hundred thousand liters of carbon tetrachloride (CCl4) or tetrachloroethylene (C2Cl4) stored in underground tanks.

Occurrence
The representative terrestrial abundance of chlorine-37 is 24.22(4)% of chlorine atoms, with a normal range of 24.14–24.36% of chlorine atoms. When measuring deviations in isotopic composition, the usual reference point is "Standard Mean Ocean Chloride" (SMOC), although a NIST Standard Reference Material (975a) also exists. SMOC is known to be around 24.219% chlorine-37 and to have an atomic weight of around 35.4525

There is a known variation in the isotopic abundance of chlorine-37. This heavier isotope tends to be more prevalent in chloride minerals than in aqueous solutions such as sea water, although the isotopic composition of organochlorine compounds can vary in either direction from the SMOC standard in the range of several parts per thousand.

See also
Beta decay
Neutrino detection
Isotopic tracer
Isotopes of chlorine

References

Isotopes of chlorine